Khisar Dam is an under-construction dam, located in Nushki District, Balochistan, Pakistan.

References

Dams in Pakistan
Hydroelectric power stations in Pakistan
Nushki District
Dams in Balochistan, Pakistan